Introduction to Electrodynamics is a textbook by the physicist David J. Griffiths. Generally regarded as a standard undergraduate text on the subject, it began as lecture notes that have been perfected over time. Its most recent edition, the fourth, was published in 2013 by Pearson and in 2017 by Cambridge University Press. This book uses SI units (the mks convention) exclusively. A table for converting between SI and Gaussian units is given in Appendix C.

Griffiths said he was able to reduce the price of his textbook on quantum mechanics simply by changing the publisher, from Pearson to Cambridge University Press. He has done the same with this one. (See the ISBN in the box to the right.)

Contents
The front cover has a picture of the handwritten Poisson's equations for electricity and magnetism on a chalkboard. The first inner cover contains vector identities, vector derivatives in Cartesian, spherical, and cylindrical coordinates, and the fundamental theorems of vector calculus. The second inner cover contains the basic equations of electrodynamics, the accepted values of some fundamental constants, and the transformation equations for spherical and cylindrical coordinates.

Table of Contents (4th edition)

Preface
Advertisement
Chapter 1: Vector Analysis
Chapter 2: Electrostatics
Chapter 3: Potentials
Chapter 4: Electric Fields in Matter
Chapter 5: Magnetostatics
Chapter 6: Magnetic Fields in Matter
Chapter 7: Electrodynamics
Chapter 8: Conservation Laws
Chapter 9: Electromagnetic Waves
Chapter 10: Potentials and Fields
Chapter 11: Radiation
Chapter 12: Electrodynamics and Relativity
Appendix A: Vector Calculus in Curvilinear Coordinates
Appendix B: The Helmholtz Theorem
Appendix C: Units
Index

Reception
Paul D. Scholten, a professor at Miami University (Ohio), opined that the first edition of this book offers a streamlined, though not always in-depth, coverage of the fundamental physics of electrodynamics. Special topics such as superconductivity or plasma physics are not mentioned. Breaking with tradition, Griffiths did not give solutions to all the odd-numbered questions in the book. Another unique feature of the first edition is the informal, even emotional, tone. The author sometimes referred to the reader directly. Physics received the primary focus. Equations are derived and explained, and common misconceptions are addressed.
According to Robert W. Scharstein from the Department of Electrical Engineering at the University of Alabama, the mathematics used in the third edition is just enough to convey the subject and the problems are valuable teaching tools that do not involve the "plug and chug disease." Although students of electrical engineering are not expected to encounter complicated boundary-value problems in their career, this book is useful to them as well, because of its emphasis on conceptual rather than mathematical issues. He argued that with this book, it is possible to skip the more mathematically involved sections to the more conceptually interesting topics, such as antennas. Moreover, the tone is clear and entertaining. Using this book "rejuvenated" his enthusiasm for teaching the subject.Colin Inglefield, an associate professor of physics at Weber State University (Utah), commented that the third edition is notable for its informal and conversational style that may appeal to a large class of students. The ordering of its chapters and its contents are fairly standard and are similar to texts at the same level. The first chapter offers a valuable review of vector calculus, which is essential for understanding this subject. Unlike some comparable books, the level of mathematical sophistication is not particularly high. For example, Green's functions are not anywhere mentioned. Instead, physical intuition and conceptual understanding are emphasized. In fact, care is taken to address common misconceptions and pitfalls. It contains no computer exercises. Nevertheless, it is perfectly adequate for undergraduate instruction in physics. As of June 2005, Inglefield has taught three semesters using this book.

Physicists Yoni Kahn of Princeton University and Adam Anderson of the Fermi National Accelerator Laboratory indicated that Griffiths' Electrodynamics offers a dependable treatment of all materials in the electromagnetism section of the Physics Graduate Record Examinations (Physics GRE) except circuit analysis.

Editions

See also

Introduction to Quantum Mechanics by the same author
Classical Electrodynamics by John David Jackson, a commonly used graduate-level textbook.
List of textbooks in electromagnetism
List of textbooks on classical and quantum mechanics
List of textbooks in thermodynamics and statistical mechanics
List of books on general relativity

Notes

References

Further reading 

 A graduate textbook.

Electromagnetism
Physics textbooks
Electrodynamics
1981 non-fiction books
Undergraduate education